KFTY-LD (channel 45) is a low-power television station licensed to Middletown, California, United States, affiliated with BeIN Sports Xtra. The station is owned by HC2 Holdings.

History 
The station’s construction permit was issued on February 25, 2010 under the calls of K02QO-D. It moved to its current callsign KFTY-LD on November 12, 2013.

Technical information

Subchannels
The station's digital signal is multiplexed:

References

External links

Low-power television stations in the United States
Innovate Corp.
FTY-LD
Television channels and stations established in 2010
2010 establishments in California